Krivaya Polyana is a rural locality (a selo) and the administrative center of Krivopolyanskoye Rural Settlement, Ostrogozhsky District, Voronezh Oblast, Russia. The population was 330 as of 2010. There are 10 streets.

Geography 
Krivaya Polyana is located 32 km south of Ostrogozhsk (the district's administrative centre) by road. Rastykaylovka is the nearest rural locality.

References 

Rural localities in Ostrogozhsky District